Les Albres is a commune in the Aveyron department in the Occitanie region of southern France.

The inhabitants of the commune are known as Albrégeois or Albrégeoises

Geography
Les Albres is located some 15 km south-east of Figeac and 5 km west of Decazeville. It can be accessed on the D994 road from Asprières in the west, passing through the village and continuing south-east to Montbazens. There is also the D144 small and winding road from Bouillac in the north and the D22 road branching from the D5 in the east and coming to the village via a tortuous route. The commune is mostly farmland with about 30% of the area forested. There are several hamlets other than the village. These are:
Bor
Brayes
Gabriac
La Bastidie
La Revelie
Les Hens
Les Parras
Malaret

Numerous streams rise in the commune and mostly flow south-east. The Ruisseau de l'Estang forms the western border of the commune but most of the other streams are unnamed. There are a number of small lakes and ponds scattered through the commune

Neighbouring communes and villages

Administration

List of Successive Mayors

Demography
The commune existed in 1793 but in 1834 joined the commune of Asprières together with Vernet-le-Haut. In 1877 however it was separated again. In 1974 it joined the commune of Viviez but again in 1978 it separated. In 2017, the commune had 346 inhabitants.

Notable people linked to the commune
Father Augustin Brassac was born in Brayes hamlet in Les Albres commune in 1873 and was ordained a priest in 1896. Described later in the new edition of the Biblical Handbook by Father Vigouroux, Father Brassac was deemed by Rome to be too "modernist". All his writings were blacklisted in 1923. Barred from teaching, he was appointed curate at Saint-Supice and he died in 1941. He was partly rehabilitated in 1943 by the encyclical Divino afflante which authorized the historical-critical method in Catholic theology.

See also
Communes of the Aveyron department

Bibliography
Christian-Pierre Bedel, preface by Jacques Dournes, Capdenac, Los Aures, Asprièras, Balaguièr, Bolhac, Causse-e-Diège, Foissac, Naussac, Salas, Sonnac / Christian-Pierre Bedel e los estatjants del canton de Capdenac, Rodez, Mission départementale de la culture, 1996, A1 canton collection, 240 pages, ill., cov. ill. 28 cm, ISSN 1151-8375, BnF 36688708h

External links
Les Albres on Géoportail, National Geographic Institute (IGN) website 
les Arbres on the 1750 Cassini Map

References

Communes of Aveyron